Cavill Heugh (born 31 August 1962) is an Australian former professional rugby league footballer who played in the 1980s and 1990s. A , he played in the Brisbane Rugby League premiership for Easts, winning the Rothmans Medal with them in 1984. The following year he made his State of Origin début for the Maroons from the bench. The year after that he was selected in Queensland's run-on side.

Background
Cavill Heugh was born in Innisfail, Queensland, Australia

Playing career
Cavill Heugh won the 1984 Brisbane Rothmans Medal for best and fairest in the Brisbane Rugby League, while playing for Easts.

Heugh joined Halifax (Heritage № 954) in September 1985 for the 1985–86 season and played 29 games in all competitions as Halifax won the Championship. He scored 7 tries and 12 goals in league games plus 1 try and 6 goals in a Yorkshire Cup match against Huddersfield. 
   
In 1987 Heugh joined the Illawarra Steelers in the New South Wales Rugby League premiership, playing with them for three seasons from 1987 to 1989. He then moved to England where he played for Barrow (1988–89), Leeds (Heritage №) (1989–92), Rochdale Hornets (1992–94), London Broncos (Heritage № 264) (1994–95), and Wakefield Trinity (Heritage № 1079).

References

External links
(archived by web.archive.org) Queensland Representatives at qrl.com.au
(archived by web.archive.org) Cavill Heugh at yesterdayshero.com.au

1962 births
Living people
Australian rugby league players
Barrow Raiders players
Eastern Suburbs Tigers players
Illawarra Steelers players
Leeds Rhinos players
London Broncos players
Queensland Rugby League State of Origin players
Rochdale Hornets players
Rugby league props
Wakefield Trinity players
Rugby league players from Innisfail, Queensland